Atribacter is a genus of bacteria of the candidate phylum Atribacterota with one known species (Atribacter laminatus).

References

Bacteria by classification
Bacteria genera
Monotypic bacteria genera
Taxa described in 2021